Swept Away may refer to:
Swept Away (television), an episode from Discovery Channel's series I Shouldn't Be Alive
Swept Away (Steve Hunter album), 1977 album by session guitarist Steve Hunter
"Swept Away" (Diana Ross song),1984
Swept Away (Diana Ross album), a 1984 album by Diana Ross
Swept Away, a 2004 EP by The Avett Brothers
Swept Away (1974 film), a 1974 Italian film written and directed by Lina Wertmüller
Swept Away (2002 film), a 2002 remake directed by Guy Ritchie and starring Madonna
"Swept Away", a song by Yanni, first on his 1988 album Chameleon Days
"Swept Away", a song by Nellie McKay from her 2005 album Pretty Little Head
"Swept Away", a song by The xx from their 2012 album Coexist
Swept Away (Marc Johnson album), a 2012 ECM jazz album by Marc Johnson and Eliane Elias
Swept Away (Jesse Colin Young album), 1994
"Swept Away", a song by Against All Will from the album A Rhyme & Reason